Karl Jakob Hoffmann (2 February 1820, in St. Gallen – 18 December 1895, in St. Gallen) was a Swiss politician of the Free Democratic Party and President of the Swiss Council of States (1877/1878 and 1889/1890). 

After studying law in Bern, Jena and Munich, Karl Hoffmann obtained a doctorate in 1839 and became a lawyer in St. Gallen (1840–1891). He was elected to the Grand Conseil of the Canton of St. Gallen between 1853 and 1870, and again between 1873 and 1895. In parallel, he was elected to the Council of States between 1873 in 1891.

On 22 February 1881, he was elected to the Swiss Federal Council but declined the election for family reasons.

His son Arthur Hoffmann (1857–1927) was a member of the Federal Council  (1911–1917).

Works

References 

1820 births
1895 deaths
Members of the Council of States (Switzerland)
Presidents of the Council of States (Switzerland)
People from St. Gallen (city)